Christmas Every Day is a 1996 American made-for-television fantasy-comedy film based on the 1892 short story "Christmas Every Day" by William Dean Howells.

It was directed by Larry Peerce, starred Erik von Detten, and originally broadcast on The Family Channel during their first 25 Days of Christmas programming block.

The movie was remade into an ABC Family TV movie in 2006 titled Christmas Do-Over.

Original story by Howells
"Christmas Every Day" is a short story by William Dean Howells about a young American girl, whose wish that Christmas would come daily is granted for an entire year. It was published in Christmas Every Day and Other Stories Told for Children in 1892.

Plot
The film is set in the fictional town of Greenwood Falls, Virginia (just outside Washington, D.C.) and stars Erik von Detten as Billy Jackson, a selfish teenager forced to relive the same Christmas every day. Billy's sister (Yvonne Zima) wishes that it was Christmas every day, and thereafter he has to keep repeating Christmas Day until he realizes the true meaning of the holiday season.

The movie also stars Robert Hays and Bess Armstrong as Billy's parents.

Billy finds the entire experience to be a nightmare. "My life is on rewind," he moans. Each December 25, he must face the school bully (Tyler Mason Buckalew); he must also get involved in his grocer father's dispute with his fat-cat uncle (Robert Curtis Brown) who wants to build a mega-store and ruin the local merchants.

Cast
 Robert Hays – Henry Jackson
 Bess Armstrong – Molly Jackson
 Erik von Detten – Billy Jackson
 Yvonne Zima – Sarah Jackson
 Robert Curtis Brown – Uncle David Jackson
 Robin Riker – Aunt Carolyn Jackson
 Julia Whelan – Cousin Jacey Jackson
 Tyler Mason Buckalew – Joey Manusco
 Terrence Currier – Mr. Charmers (as Terrence P. Currier)
 Kara Woods – Diane
 Lindsay Austin Hough – Mike

See also 
 List of films featuring time loops
 List of Christmas films

References

External links
 

1996 television films
1996 films
American Christmas films
Films directed by Larry Peerce
Films scored by Billy Goldenberg
ABC Family original films
Christmas television films
1990s English-language films
Time loop films
MTM Enterprises films
Television films based on short fiction
1990s Christmas films